Khodabakhsh or Khoda Bakhsh may refer to:
 Khodabakhsh, Fars
 Khodabakhsh, South Khorasan